River City is a Scottish television soap opera that was first broadcast on BBC One Scotland on 24 September 2002. River City follows the lives of the people who live and work in the fictional district of Shieldinch. In November 2017, a short crossover episode of the show was made for Children in Need and featured several of the show's characters meeting characters from Scottish sitcom Scot Squad. In March 2020, production of River City was halted due to the COVID–19 pandemic, and filming recommenced in August 2020. In place of new episodes, a select number of "classic" episodes were aired. In February 2022, it was announced the cast were back filming another series. In March of the same year the show returned to its original broadcast pattern of two half-hour episodes a week.

Setting
River City is set in Shieldinch, a fictional district in the west end of Glasgow, the largest city in Scotland. Shieldinch was founded in 1860 and was known for its shipyard (the local pub is named "The Tall Ship", which is a tribute to the areas's shipbuilding heritage). The name is derived from the real districts of Whiteinch and Shieldhall, located on opposite banks of the River Clyde.

Filming takes place on a set built specifically for the soap opera in the nearby town of Dumbarton. Other BBC programmes are filmed on the same set during the summer months, including Still Game, Millie Inbetween and Shetland.

Characters

The storylines featured in River City are based on personal relationships and family life. Community involvement and the ability to come to terms with family issues, distress, and disagreements contribute to the development of each character. One of the original families that River City had been centered on was the Hamilton family that included Malcolm Hamilton; his daughters; Eileen Donachie, formally called Eileen Henderson; Gina Hamilton, previously known as Gina Buchanan and Gina Rossi; Gina's daughters; Ruth Rossi; Green; and Joanne Rossi. Another family that was integral to River City was the Hendersons. Both of these families have grown as the show has gone on. Eileen had two children, Kirsty and Brian, with her husband Raymond, as well as a stepdaughter Hazel who was her second husband Tommy's daughter from a previous marriage. She later had another son, Stuart, with Raymond that happened by chance. Joanne Rossi's son Franco and Ruth Rossi's daughter Ellie also became part of the show.

The Hamilton and Adams-Mullen families were the main focus of the plot for several River City storylines. The Hamiltons played centre stage from the drama's beginnings in 2002, and the Adams–Mullen families from around 2003. Around the start of 2007, the storylines were based around the recently integrated Murdoch clan. In the year 2008 a new couple, the McKees, had been brought into the show when they made a new home in Shieldinch, giving them a big part in several storylines focused on their lives outside Shieldinch and the challenges of coming to a new town. As well as this, 2009 saw the introduction of the students and the hairdressers, consisting of father, daughter and two stylists. The current longest-serving character is Bob O'Hara, played by Stephen Purdon. He is the longest-serving character since Deirdre Davis' (Eileen Donachie) exit in May 2016 (the last character to have appeared since Episode 1). Scarlett O'Hara, played by Sally Howitt, is the longest-serving female character, having appeared since 2003. In 2016, Scottish actress Juliet Cadzow, known for appearing in Balamory, joined the soap.

Notable storylines

2002
The series begins on 24 September 2002 with the wedding of Eileen and Tommy Donachie, who then own the local Tall Ship public house. Eileen's ex-husband (and father of her two children) turns up on her wedding day, apparently unhappy; so is Eileen's old flame, Lewis Cope, who turns up in Shieldinch. Gina Rossi's daughter Joanne has an affair with Cormac (her sister Ruth's partner), who becomes an enemy of Lewis and many others. Eileen has a sordid affair with Lewis, which ends her marriage to Tommy. The underage Kirsty Henderson has a relationship with Russ (angering her father, Raymond). Derek Henderson's mother, Alice, returns after a sixteen-year absence; George, Derek's grandfather, had paid Alice to leave him for good and raised Derek. Although Joanne falls for Nazir Malik (leading to heartache), Shieldinch has a happy Christmas.

2003
Tommy is killed by the Shieldinch Strangler, who becomes a recurring character. Revenge became a big part of everyone's lives as an abrupt Ewan injects Lewis with heroin for revenge and Lewis becomes HIV positive. Shellsuit Bob declares his love for Zara Malik (who has been racially bullied), but their relationship is short-lived. Although Joanne's relationship with Nazir fails, she has his child and names him Franco after her late father. Jealous of her husband's relationships with other women, Helen kidnaps Franco twice; the second time, Ewan talks her out of committing suicide with the baby. Gina discovers that Dr Marcus McKenzie (her new love interest) is a rapist and becomes one of his victims. Marcus also attempts to rape Heather Bellshaw, who kills him (although Gina's daughter, Joanne, is a suspect). Hazel is kidnapped by the mentally-ill Brian Henderson, who has become obsessed with her.

2004
Brian worsens. He takes his grandmother, Moira, for a joyride and kills her; this draws attention to his mental state. Hazel (kidnapped by Brian) is rescued by Vader, and they fall in love. Trouble begins between Billy Davies and Lewis Cope when Billy loses a poker bet of a night with his wife, Della, to Lewis. Raymond orchestrates a reunion of Roisin and Alanna, the 16-year-old daughter she had surrendered for adoption when she was young. Alanna becomes involved with the married Vader, who uses her. Bob falls in love with Michelle and her baby, Rochelle. Eileen has another affair with Archie Buchanan, her sister's partner. The Cullen family includes sisters Zoe and Nicki and their mother, Patricia, a drug addict. Heather is in the dock at Marcus' trial. Marcus' daughter, Steph McKenzie, avenges (she thinks) her father's murder by stabbing Joanne. Raymond remarries Roisin McIntyre. Dr. Vinnie Shah commits suicide after he gives Zoe drugs to sell to pay her family's rent and she blackmails him.

2005
Ruth returns from Italy and tells Robbie Macfarlane that she is married; he does not believe her until Marty appears and they declare their love. McCabe shows his softer side when his daughter (Natalie Stewart, who has Down syndrome) appears. Bubba Law and Declan Hartley's affair is discovered, destroying Abbi and Declan's marriage. Robyn Hunter is distraught when her partner, Mac, takes up with a much-younger Zoe Cullen. Alice tries to avenge Mac by downloading child pornography to his laptop, and is sentenced to six months in prison. Alisha (Vinnie's sister) arrives in Shieldinch to carry on his work and rebuild both her and her brother's lives. Alanna's abusive, alcoholic father Alex arrives in Shieldinch; he dies when his caravan catches fire (from which Raymond, Roisin and Alanna narrowly escape). Archie Buchanan worms his way back into Gina's life after his affair with her sister, Eileen. Heather's estranged husband, Duncan, turns up with her daughter Freya. Franco's secret son, Luca, arrives from Italy to meet his estranged family. Mac turns his attentions to young Nicki, and his family drives him out of Shieldinch. Michelle and Kevin rob Bob and leave Shieldinch for an unknown location with baby Rochelle. Della gives birth to Lewis Cope's baby, but Billy wants to be a father to him. Scarlett is shoved into a van by McCabe and encounters her jailbird son, Stevie. Ruth's mental health deteriorates as she makes allegations about policeman Harry Black.

2011
Scarlett is diagnosed with ovarian cancer. Lenny Murdoch returns; his daughter, Amber, has money troubles with McCabe and shoots him. McCabe's mother, thinking that Lenny killed her son, sends her daughter Vivian to spy on him as he tries to take over McCabe's empire. She dies after failing to set Lenny ablaze, and Vivian gives DCI Craig Donald the names of her late brother's contacts.

2012
Lenny Murdoch decides to send Gabriel Brodie to spy on Sean Kennedy, a local pimp and reported rival of Lenny's predecessor (Thomas McCabe), by working for him. Sean targets Michael Brodie, who is imprisoned for killing Cammy (who has Michael's daughter, Nicole, in his grip) and one of his henchmen. He is then murdered by Raymond Henderson after Raymond discovers that Sean killed Deek with his car. Raymond causes a gas leak in the Tall Ship; when he uses a cigarette lighter, the pub blows up. Raymond is never arrested. Sean's father, Billy, turns up with vengeance on his mind. He kidnaps Stevie Burns and tries to make a  deal with his son's arch-rival, Lenny.

2013
Stella and Stevie's affair worsens and Stella's brother, Mark, turns up. Scarlett is concerned that her cancer has returned. Nicole tells Stevie that she is pregnant with his child before she learns that the father someone she met at a club. Gareth, working for Billy Kennedy, determines to start a family with Nicole; this means that he must be an informant for the police. While Nicole is giving birth, Gareth (whose police evidence has been discovered) is shot by Billy and falls into the river.

Stevie and Stella are excited about Stella's pregnancy, but she is unhappy at Mark's return. Mark picks a fight with a drug dealer, Davey, in the flat and Stella miscarries. Stevie blames Mark; when he sees Mark choking after taking drugs, however, he and his best friend Raymond try to save Mark's life.

2014
Zinnie testifies against Jamie McAllistair to (hopefully) imprison him for life. Gabriel and Mandy try to keep their affair from Mandy's gangster husband, Billy, but a showdown leaves one of them dead. Nicole, at her breaking point after losing Gareth, decides to move to Aberdeen and begin a new life. Eileen tries to fight the council, which is demolishing the heart of Shieldinch. Robbie and Will reconcile and decide to adopt, which is more difficult than they had thought.

Murray believes that the local councilor (Eileen) was bribed to agree to the Leatherhill development to build cheap buildings on unsuitable land. Lenny Murdoch is trying to help Councilor Frank Paton build his development on a toxic-waste dump. He tells Eileen that he knows she was involved with Frank Paton's downfall and she knew he had struck Derek Henderson and allowed Raymond to be framed for Sean Kennedy's murder.

The Lindseys move into the Brodies' old house. Their youngest daughter, Kirsty, is caught drinking in the pub and lies to Zinnie about her father, Alan. Alan, the project manager of the Shieldinch development, is upset about building on dangerous chemicals.

Angus Lindsey makes a deal with Bob to forge MOT tests for stolen cars. Billy Kennedy is sentenced to  20 years in prison for killing his lawyer, Paul Maleik, and dumping his body on a railway track. Kirsty Lindsay lies about Murray Crozier; although she says she was only kidding before his case goes to court, he leaves Shieldinch.

Robbie and Will get a three-month trial with their foster son, Finn McKay, who comes to Shieldinch searching for his sister. Forbidden to look for her, he becomes involved with Kirsty. Finn has a row with Will and Robbie; he goes to Robbie's salon and trashes it. When Will finds out, he chases Finn down the street; Finn hits his head against a wooden pole several times, and accuses Will of hitting him. On the advice of his social worker, Sandra, Finn drops the charges and goes back to stay with Will and Robbie.

Raymond is murdered by Councilor Frank Paton, who makes it look like suicide. DI Donald arrests Frank, and DCI Rachel Grant returns to Shieldinch.

Eileen resigns from the council after Raymond's death. Alan Lindsay and Alex McAllister have a fight. 
Kelly Marie ends her relationship with Alex after Lenny tells her that he knew about the cancer cluster when he began his development. Kelly Marie reconsiders, and brings Alex back into the family.

Scarlett throws Wee Bob out of her house when he brings home too many friends for a party, and he moves in with his Gran and his uncle. Angus and Wee Bob decide to buy a flat, but after paying the deposit they discover that they were conned. Angus tries to rekindle his relationship with Zinnie, but she is not interested.

After the Mini Market goes into administration, Scarlett asks Molly to invest her Premium Bond winnings in the shop. This leads to a family argument, during which Big Bob has an apparent heart attack. It is only a kidney stone, but he had to wait for a special ambulance and equipment because of his weight and was filmed by some teenagers as he was carried to the ambulance; Big Bob decides to do something about his weight. Molly gives her winnings to him so he can go to rehab, and Tom Urie leaves the show. Scarlett is furious, since she feels that Molly has broken her promise.

Stevie Burns, struggling to cope after Raymond's death, buys some heroin; Eileen catches him before he can use it, and later tells Stella. Stella thinks that she is pregnant; it is discovered to be an ovarian cyst, and she does not tell Stevie.

Frank Paton (who murdered Raymond) is let out of jail and not charged. Stevie finds out and tries to kill him with a pair of scissors, but DI Donald Stops him from doing so. Donald tells Frank that he still believes he killed Raymond.

2015
Scarlett and Jimmy open their new business, which Scarlett decides to call "Scarlett's One Stop Shop"; Jimmy wants to name it "Mullen's". Big Buster the Wrestler (Grado) opens the shop and meets his old flame, Ellie McLean (Leah McRae). Eileen dislikes Ellie, believing that she does not have enough experience. On Ellie's second day, she takes Malcolm to Buster's wrestling match; although Eileen is annoyed, Liz returns from her holiday and is delighted to see that Malcolm is happy after seeing Buster.

Kelly Marie decides to move in with Alex after he buys a new bed for Callum. Scarlett's stepson, Paddy (Junior) Adams, arrives after he is released from prison. Paddy's father, Patrick, was in prison when he was younger; Scarlett had to put Paddy into day care, since she had to look after her own children. Kelly Marie immediately likes Paddy, but it takes Bob a while longer. Molly has advertised for a new lodger (much to Bob's displeasure), but likes none of the many applicants. Ellie McLean and Molly go to the Tall Ships' karaoke night, and Molly decides that Ellie is her new lodger. Bob and Angus spend a day in the countryside; after getting lost, they return home. Patrick takes the news that Bob is not Scarlett's son badly, and Buster returns to Shieldinch after wrestling in America in an attempt to get Ellie McLean back.

DI Donald's estranged father is found dead in the river. Donald investigates, and learns that the hostel in which he was staying is owned by Frank Paton. Eileen and Craig confront Frank, who tries to Kill Eileen like he killed Raymond; DCI Grant and DI Donald stop him in time. Alex tries to oppose Lenny, but is followed and shot.

Kelly Marie decides to reopen Alex's club, Chrome, after he signs it over to her. Alex and his uncle, Billy Kennedy (serving a life sentence for murdering his lawyer), secretly set up a fake security guard at the club.

Angus Lindsay organises a comeback wrestling match for Big Buster; when the opponent is a no-show, Bob jumps into the ring with him. Dan and Tatiana are worried, since Tatiana is being deported back to Ukraine. Christina returns to Shieldinch to help her mother. Molly is delighted that Christina is on her mother's side after what Tatiana did to Molly's son. Tatiana is deported; Dan is depressed and Zinnie tries to look out for him, but Angus seas it as too close for comfort. Dan offers Zinnie Tatiana's job at the health centre, which leaves Stevie looking for someone new at the Ship. After Stella's cancer scare, Doctor Dan tells her that the cancer will probably not recur.

Ellie is concerned about Malcolm's health, but Liz ignores her. After Malcolm's condition worsens, Ellie phones a caretaker and Liz and Eileen bring Malcolm to a care home. Liz is worried because the nurse told her that she could not see Malcolm for 48 hours, and Eileen tries to comfort her.

Bob, Ellie, Angus and Zinnie go to the first ever Tall Ship quiz night. When they all get drunk, Bob and Ellie walk home. When she tells him that Buster doesn't seem to listen to her or have time for her, Bob kisses her. The next day, he tries to tell Ellie how he feels.

Alan begins seeing Grace, who is trying to tell her daughter Josie that the man she is marrying (Ewan) has robbed Bob and is a troublemaker. Ewan asks Duncan for his blessing of the marriage, and Grace tries to persuade Duncan that Josie deserves better. Ewan takes a picture of Grace and Alan in the caravan and begins to blackmail Grace; he will tell Duncan about their secret relationship if she does not give him and Josie her blessing. To stop the wedding, Grace tells Duncan she has been having affair with handyman Alan Lindsay (knowing that Ewan's family would not want him to marry into the Bucknall family).

Gabriel tries to help Kelly Marie at Chrome, to Alex's dismay; Alex is involved in questionable dealings with his security man. Dan, depressed since Tatiana left, needs some pills; he uses his patient, Stella Adams', name on the prescription. Stella agrees to help Dan just this once because she knows what he is going through. When Zinnie thinks she sees Dan and Stella too close together, she tells Angus that she thinks they are having an affair. Zinnie tells Stevie to talk to Stella about Dan. Alan Lindsey decides to search for Grace; Angus wants to go with him, much to Zinnie's annoyance. Alan tells Angus that he has his family in Shieldinch, and leaves without him. Lenny trusts lawyer Ellie Gunn with Cal's trust fund.

Gabriel leaves Shieldinch when Nicole returns and says that she did not do as well as she thought she would. Dan offers Zinnie a one-year internship with Peace Doctors in Nepal; unsure what to do, Angus tries to persuade her to stay. Stevie has doubts about fatherhood and a lifetime with Stella. He and Zinnie meet at Chrome and kiss, agreeing to forget all about it. Zinnie decides to go to Nepal; Angus proposes to her in front of the packed Tall Ship, and she accepts.

Eileen organises the first Shieldinch festival, coinciding with the arrival of AJ and Annie Jandhu. AJ, Eileen's first love, arranges to catch up with Eileen and she is disappointed that he is married. Zinnie returns from her parents with a dilemma; she still wants to go to Nepal, and is unsure about marrying Angus. She confides in Stevie, whose doubts about fatherhood have increased after seeing his own father.  While the Tall Ship is closed, Stevie and Zinnie get drunk and have sex in the pub's kitchen. Bob, who dropped by to get tinfoil for the festival float, sees them. Lenny is trying to get his car out of Shieldinch, but all the roads are closed; he is unaware that Jimmy had earlier seen a mysterious figure hovering round his car. Ellie's sister, Caitlin, jumps into his car; she is anxious to meet her secret partner for a holiday. Whilst driving, Lenny notices cables in the car and the ABS light is on. Realising what has happened, he orders Caitlin out of the car and tells everyone to keep back. Zinnie, coming out of her flat and unable to react in time, is fatally injured in the explosion. She tells Angus she is sorry before she dies, but he is unsure of what she is apologising for. Lenny is also rushed to hospital and has a heart attack due to his MS, but is stable. Stevie struggles with guilt over what has happened. Bob is angry and wrestles with his conscience about whether to tell Angus what he saw between Stevie and Zinnie.

Awards and nominations

 Audience Award was specifically for Most Popular Television Programme.

References

External links

 
2002 Scottish television series debuts
2000s Scottish television series
2010s Scottish television series
2020s Scottish television series
2000s British television soap operas
2010s British television soap operas
2020s British television soap operas
BBC Scotland television shows
British television soap operas
English-language television shows
Fictional populated places in Scotland
Lesbian-related television shows
Scots-language mass media
Scottish television soap operas
Television series by BBC Studios
Television productions suspended due to the COVID-19 pandemic
Television shows set in Glasgow
West Dunbartonshire